Semilinear or semi-linear (literally, "half linear") may refer to:

Mathematics 
 Antilinear map, also called a "semilinear map"
 Semilinear order
 Semilinear map
 Semilinear set
 Semilinearity (operator theory)
 Semilinear equation, a type of differential equation which is linear in the highest order derivative(s) of the unknown function
 Various forms of "mild" nonlinearity are referred to as "semilinear"

Other 
 Semilinear response, physics 
 Artificial neuron, also called a "semi-linear unit"
 Semi-linear resolution
 A mixture of linear and nonlinear gameplay in video games may be referred to as "semi-linear gameplay"